Black Sash may refer to:

Black Sash, a non-violent white women's resistance organisation
Black Sash, a 2003 television series written by Carlton Cuse
Black sash, used instead of a black belt in some martial arts